The UND Nistler College of Business and Public Administration is located in Gamble Hall at the University of North Dakota.The UND College of Business and Public administration serves 1,800 students and graduates 250 per year. The CoBPA is the largest business school in the state of North Dakota and offers the most business related programs in the North Dakota University Systems. The CoBPA is the first accredited business college in North Dakota and is one of only 777 accredited business schools world wide.

History
The UND Nistler College of Business and Public Administration was established in 1917. The current dean of the College of Business and Public Administration is Amy Henley  UND is currently in the process of designing and funding a new building to replace Gamble Hall, this new business school will be located across centennial avenue from gamble hall next to the Chester Fritz Library. In 2019 the UND College of Business and Public Administration was renamed to the Nistler College of Business & Public Administration after Werner and Colleen Nistler donated $20 Million toward the construction of a new business school.

From 2019 to 2021 UND went through the process of constructing a new building to be host of the Business school. The new business school was built to replace the former outdated facility of Gamble Hall.

Institutional milestones
1917 - Founded as the UND College of Business and Public Administration
1968 - Construction of Gamble Hall (Building Serving as Business School until 2021)
2019 - Renamed to the UND Nistler College of Business and Public Administration

Departments
The UND Nistler College of Business and Public Administration has 5 academic departments and 1 school.

Academic Regalia

Undergrad Tassel
Drab (Light Tan)

Graduate Hoods
Master of Accountancy,	M.Acct., Drab (tan)
Master of Business Administration, M.B.A., Drab (tan)
Master of Public Administration, M.P.A. Peacock Blue
Master of Science in Applied Economics, M.S.A.E., Golden Yellow

Facilities
Located in Gamble Hall at the University of North Dakota the CoBPA has four large class lecture halls surrounding a rotunda. This three floor building contains 5 computer labs and numerous interactive classrooms. The "Marketing department" is located on floor 1, the "Economics & Finance" and "Accountancy" departments are located on floor 2, and the "Political Science and Public Administration" and "Management" departments are located on floor 3.

Rankings
Online Business Analytics MBA programs, Rank 2 
Top 25 Most Innovative Schools
Best Undergraduate Business Programs Rankings
UND Nistler College of Business & Public Administration Ranks #14 in Poets&Quants Best Online MBA Programs

Accreditation
AACSB International 
National Association of Schools of Public Affairs and Administration (NASPAA).
ATMAE

Notable alumni
Steve Scheel, CEO of Scheels
Sally J. Smith, CEO of Buffalo Wild Wings
Ed Schafer
Mark Chipman, chairman of TNSE & president of Winnipeg Jets, 
Drew Wrigley, US Attorney and former Lt Governor 
Gregory R. Page, president of Cargill 
William C. Marcil, CEO of Forum Communications
Ralph Engelstad, Las Vegas Casino Owner
Wade Dokken, former CEO of Skandia
John Barry, CEO of Sun Country Airlines
Dave Fennell, Canadian Football League player and founder of Golden Star Resources
Peter Nygård, Founder and chairman of Nygård International
Troy Badar, CEO of Dairy Queen

References

Business
Business schools in the United States
Public administration schools in the United States